The 2014 Jharkhand Legislative Assembly election (Hindi: झारखण्ड विधानसभा  चुनाव) was held in five phases between November 25 and December 20 to elect the members of the 4th Jharkhand Legislative Assembly. The results were announced on December 23, 2014. The Bhartiya Janata Party (BJP) won the elections defeating The Indian National Congress (INC) and its major allies Rashtriya Janata Dal, Janata Dal (United) and Jharkhand Mukti Morcha (JMM).

The term of the legislative assembly of Jharkhand ended on January 3, 2015.  The Chief Election Commissioner announced five-phased assembly elections to be held in Jharkhand along with Jammu and Kashmir beginning November 25 and ending December 20.  Results were announced on December 23, 2014. Voter-verified paper audit trail (VVPAT) along with EVMs were used in 7 of the 81 assembly seats. The seven seats were from Jamshedpur East, Jamshedpur West, Bokaro, Dhanbad, Ranchi, Kanke and Hatia.

Voting
The five stages of the elections were held as follows:

Results

Results by constituency

Government Formation 
Raghubar Das was sworn in as the 10th chief minister of Jharkhand on 28 December 2014.

On 11 February 2015 six Jharkhand Vikas Morcha (P) MLAs  joined the BJP a day after petitioning the Speaker to allow them to sit alongside ruling BJP-led coalition members in the state Assembly.

Naveen Jaiswal (Hatia), Amar Kumar Bauri (Chandankiyari), Ganesh Ganju (Simeria), Alok Kumar Chourasia (Daltonganj), Randhir Singh (Sarath) and Janki Yadav (Barkatha) joined the party at Jharkhand Bhavan in Delhi.

See also
 2014 elections in India

References

External links

State Assembly elections in Jharkhand
2010s in Jharkhand
2014 State Assembly elections in India
November 2014 events in India
December 2014 events in India